PMK may refer to:

 Pattali Makkal Katchi, a political party in Tamil Nadu, India
 People's Movement of Kosovo, a political organization
 Popular Mechanics for Kids, a Canadian  TV series
 Pairwise Master Key in the IEEE 802.11i-2004 protocol
 Piperonyl methyl ketone, a chemical compound
 PMK gas mask, Soviet Union
 Palm Island Airport, IATA airport code